End of Discussion is an album by Flint, Michigan punk rock band The Swellers. The album was self-released by the band in 2003. The album was reissued digitally in December 2008.

Track listing
 "Immunity" - 1:38
 "Anything" - 2:35
 "His Name Is Robert Paulson" - 2:48
 "Sightless " - 2:31
 "I Wanna Be in the Mob" - 1:21
 "Sunshine" - 4:44
 "Zombie Pirates from Outer Space" - 2:33
 "Erased" - 3:37
 "Losing My Girl" - 3:19
 "Get the Process Changed" - 3:10

References

2003 albums
The Swellers albums
Self-released albums